Heng Shan Military Command Center is an underground tri-service command center in Dazhi, Zhongshan District, Taipei, Taiwan. It is the highest level military command center in Taiwan during peace and war.

History 
The construction of the command center began in 1960. This involved excavation of a mountain in the Taipei suburb of Dazhi (formerly spelled Tachih) and was only completed in 1982.

Design 
It was built to withstand attack from ballistic missiles and is connected to numerous other command posts and military bases via tunnels. It also has office space for various government agencies, cabinet and the President to be used during war.

References

1982 establishments in Taiwan
Nuclear bunkers
Taiwan
Military installations of the Republic of China
Buildings and structures in Taipei
Underground construction